Denys Maasdorp (born 17 June 1963) is a former professional tennis player from South Africa.

Biography
Maasdorp, a right-handed player from Grahamstown, played on the professional tour in the 1980s. Peaking at 180 in the world in singles, his best performance on the Grand Prix tour was a second round appearance at the 1987 Geneva Open. At the 1987 Wimbledon Championships he competed in the main draw of the mixed doubles, partnering Tina Mochizuki. He won a Challenger doubles tournament in the Austrian city of Graz in 1988.

After leaving the tour he continued to play league tennis in Germany for many years. He now coaches in the United States.

Challenger titles

Doubles: (1)

References

External links
 
 

1963 births
Living people
South African male tennis players
People from Makhanda, Eastern Cape
South African expatriates in the United States
Sportspeople from the Eastern Cape